Split Ends is an American reality television series on the Style Network that debuted on November 17, 2006 and ran for five seasons. The series follows high-end salon workers who swap jobs with small-town hair stylists for three days. Each stylist must see if they can keep the clients happy and be able to adjust to each other's environment.

Episodes

Season 1 (2006–2007)

Season 2 (2007)

Season 3 (2008)

Season 4 (2008–2009)

Season 5 (2009)

References

2000s American reality television series
2006 American television series debuts
2009 American television series endings
English-language television shows